Warren C. "Brady" Cowell (December 12, 1899 – April 15, 1989) was an American college football, basketball, and baseball coach and college athletic director.  Cowell played football, basketball and baseball at Kansas State Agricultural College, and later served as the basketball and baseball head coach at the University of Florida, and the football and basketball head coach and athletic director at Stetson University.

Early years
Cowell was born in Clay Center, Kansas in 1899 and served in the United States Army during World War I. He attended Kansas State Agricultural College, where he lettered in football, basketball, and baseball before graduating in 1922.

Coaching career 

After graduating from Kansas State, Cowell coached for two years at Iola High School in Iola, Kansas.  In 1924, he moved on to the University of Florida in Gainesville, Florida, where he accepted a position as the head coach for the freshman Florida Gators football team, and later as an assistant coach for the Gators varsity from 1928 to 1932.  Cowell served as the head coach of the Florida Gators basketball team from 1925 to 1933, compiling an eight-season win–loss record of 83–96.  He also coached the Florida Gators baseball team from 1927 to 1933, tallying a seven-season record of 61–65–2.

Cowell served as the athletic director and head football coach at Stetson University in DeLand, Florida from 1935 to 1948, leading the Stetson Hatters to a record of 32–40–7; Stetson did not field a team from 1941 to 1945 due to World War II.  Cowell was also the head coach of the Stetson Hatters basketball team for three one-season stints (1938–39, 1941–42, 1945–46), amassing a career college basketball record of 83–96.

Life after coaching 

Cowell quit coaching after the 1948 football season, but remained Stetson's athletic director until his retirement in 1968.  He died on April 15, 1989, at his home in DeLand, Florida.

Head coaching record

Football

Baseball

References

External links
 

1899 births
1989 deaths
American men's basketball players
Basketball coaches from Kansas
Basketball players from Kansas
Florida Gators baseball coaches
Florida Gators football coaches
Florida Gators men's basketball coaches
Kansas State Wildcats baseball players
Kansas State Wildcats football players
Kansas State Wildcats men's basketball players
Stetson Hatters athletic directors
Stetson Hatters football coaches
Stetson Hatters men's basketball coaches
Sunshine State Conference commissioners
United States Army personnel of World War I
United States Army soldiers
People from Iola, Kansas
People from Clay County, Kansas
Coaches of American football from Kansas
Players of American football from Kansas
Baseball coaches from Kansas
Baseball players from Kansas